Spencer Dickinson was a blues project made up of Jon Spencer of Blues Explosion and Luther Dickinson of the North Mississippi Allstars.  They released two albums:
Spencer Dickinson CD (Toy's Factory, 2001, TFCK-87263)
The Man Who Lives For Love CD (Yep Roc Records, 2006, YEP 2078)

References

American blues musical groups
Yep Roc Records artists